Phrynobatrachus fraterculus is a species of frog in the family Phrynobatrachidae. It is found in Ivory Coast, Guinea, Liberia, Sierra Leone and possibly Guinea-Bissau. Its natural habitats are subtropical or tropical moist lowland forest, subtropical or tropical moist montane forest, rivers, plantations and heavily degraded former forest. It is threatened by habitat loss.

References

fraterculus
Taxa named by Paul Chabanaud
Amphibians described in 1921
Taxonomy articles created by Polbot